York Iron Company Mine is a historic iron mine site located at North Codorus Township, York County, Pennsylvania.  The underground mine was originally opened in 1854, with additional openings dug in 1876–1877.  The mine remained in operation until 1888.

It was added to the National Register of Historic Places in 1985.

References

Industrial buildings and structures on the National Register of Historic Places in Pennsylvania
Buildings and structures in York County, Pennsylvania
History of York County, Pennsylvania
National Register of Historic Places in York County, Pennsylvania